The 2014 AFC Futsal Club Championship was the 5th AFC Futsal Club Championship. It was held in Chengdu, China 25–30 August 2014.

Qualification 

Apart from hosts China and defending champions Thailand, teams from Iran, Japan, Uzbekistan, Kuwait, Australia and Lebanon competed in this championship.

Venues

Group stage

Group A

Group B

Knockout stage

Semi-finals

Third place play-off

Final

Awards 

 Most Valuable Player
  Kaoru Morioka
 Top Scorer
  Kaoru Morioka
 Fair-Play Award
  Nagoya Oceans
 All-Star Team
  Ryuma Shinoda (Nagoya Oceans) (GK)
  Kaoru Morioka (Nagoya Oceans)
  Vahid Shafiei (Dabiri Tabriz)
  Suphawut Thueanklang (Chonburi Blue Wave)
  Kritsada Wongkaeo (Chonburi Blue Wave)
 Reserve All-Star Team
  Esmail Abbasian (Chonburi Blue Wave) (GK)
  Farid Namazi (Dabiri Tabriz)
  Tomoki Yoshikawa (Nagoya Oceans)
  Danilo Moura (Shenzhen Nanling Tielang)
  Behrouz Jafari (Dabiri Tabriz)
 Coach:  Victor Acosta Garcia (Nagoya Oceans)

Top scorers

Final standing

References

External links
AFC Futsal Club Championship, the-AFC.com

2014
2014 in Chinese football
Club Championship
2014